Ferrer Point is a point projecting 700 m into the south part of Discovery Bay, Greenwich Island in the South Shetland Islands, Antarctica with an adjacent ice-free area of .  The point forms the west side of the entrance to Montecinos Cove and the northeast side of the entrance to Rodríguez Cove.

The point was charted by the 1950-51 Chilean Antarctic Expedition and named after First Lieutenant Fernando Ferrer, hydrographic officer on the transport ship Angamos during the expedition, while the cove was named by the 1947 Chilean Antarctic Expedition after Captain Rodríguez, Operations Officer of the expedition.

Location

Map
 L.L. Ivanov et al. Antarctica: Livingston Island and Greenwich Island, South Shetland Islands. Scale 1:100000 topographic map. Sofia: Antarctic Place-names Commission of Bulgaria, 2005.

Notes

References
 SCAR Composite Antarctic Gazetteer.

Headlands of Greenwich Island